The men's 110 metres hurdles event at the 1979 Summer Universiade was held at the Estadio Olimpico Universitario in Mexico City on 9 and 10 September 1979.

Medalists

Results

Heats

Wind:Heat 1: 0.0 m/s, Heat 2: 0.0 m/s, Heat 3: 0.0 m/s

Final

Wind: +0.3 m/s

References

Athletics at the 1979 Summer Universiade
1979